Alessandria del Carretto is a town and comune in the province of Cosenza in the Calabria region of Italy. Its territory is included in the Pollino National Park.

The documentary movie "I Dimenticati" Wikipedia in Italian by Vittorio de Seta was partly filmed in this town.

The movie Le quattro volte was filmed in this town.

References

Cities and towns in Calabria